Ronieri da Silva Pinto (August 19, 1991 in Cuiabá), commonly known as Ronny, is a Brazilian attacking midfielder who plays for Itumbiara.

Honours 
Palmeiras
Campeonato Brasileiro Série B: 2013

References

External links

1991 births
Living people
Brazilian footballers
Brazilian expatriate footballers
Campeonato Brasileiro Série A players
Campeonato Brasileiro Série B players
Criciúma Esporte Clube players
Figueirense FC players
Sociedade Esportiva Palmeiras players
Botafogo de Futebol e Regatas players
Association football defenders